The Kerala State Film Award for Best Sound Recordist winners:

References

Official website
PRD, Govt. of Kerala: Awardees List

Kerala State Film Awards